Isaac Wildrick (March 3, 1803 in Frelinghuysen Township, New Jersey – March 22, 1892 in Blairstown, New Jersey) was an American Democratic Party politician, who represented  in the United States House of Representatives from 1849 to 1853.

Wildrick was born in Marksboro (in Frelinghuysen Township, New Jersey) on March 3, 1803. He attended the common schools, and engaged in agricultural pursuits near Blairstown. He was constable from 1827 to 1832, coroner from 1829 to 1831, Justice of the Peace from 1834 to 1839, judge in 1839, sheriff from 1839 to 1841 and director of the county poorhouse from 1842 to 1848. He was a member of the Board of Chosen Freeholders from 1845 to 1848.

Wildrick was elected as a Democrat to the Thirty-first and Thirty-second Congresses, serving in office from March 4, 1849, to March 3, 1853, but was not a candidate for renomination in 1852.

After leaving Congress, he resumed agricultural pursuits. He was again a freeholder from 1856 to 1859, and was a member of the New Jersey General Assembly from 1882 to 1885. He died in Blairstown on March 22, 1892, and was interred in the Presbyterian Cemetery in the Marksboro section of Frelinghuysen Township.

References

External links

Isaac Wildrick at The Political Graveyard

1803 births
1892 deaths
Democratic Party members of the New Jersey General Assembly
Democratic Party members of the United States House of Representatives from New Jersey
County commissioners in New Jersey
American coroners
New Jersey sheriffs
New Jersey state court judges
People from Blairstown, New Jersey
Politicians from Warren County, New Jersey
19th-century American politicians
19th-century American judges